Firefly is the tenth studio album by British rock band Uriah Heep, released in February 1977 by Bronze Records in the UK and Warner Bros. Records in the US. It was their first album without lead vocalist and founding member David Byron, and the first of three albums with new singer John Lawton, formerly of Lucifer's Friend. Bassist Trevor Bolder made his Uriah Heep debut on this album. Barring a break of about 18 months in the early 1980s, he remained with the group until his death in 2013.

The first single from the album was "Wise Man".

The original vinyl album was a gatefold sleeve, with a cardboard lyric liner.

The album was remastered and reissued by Castle Communications in 1997 with four bonus tracks, and again in 2004 in an expanded deluxe edition.

Reception

A retrospective review by AllMusic said that the album "pursued a stripped-down sound harking back to the group's early-'70s successes," and concluded that "Firefly remains one of the most cohesive albums from Uriah Heep's mid- to late-'70s period". Martin Popoff in his Collector's Guide to Heavy Metal defined the album as "a mixed bag of scroungy, comatose blues ballads, nerdy party rockers and scary prog rock abortions", proving the intensification of "the deconstruction of a once great collective".

Track listing

Personnel
Uriah Heep
 Mick Box – guitars
 Ken Hensley – keyboards, guitars, backing vocals
 Lee "The Bear" Kerslake – drums, backing vocals
 Trevor Bolder – bass guitar
 John Lawton – lead vocals

Production
 Gerry Bron – producer
 Peter Gallen – engineer
 John Gallen – assistant engineer
 Gail Clarke – cover concept and coordination
 Martin White – cover painting

Charts

Album

Singles

References

External links
 The Official Uriah Heep Discography
 

1977 albums
Uriah Heep (band) albums
Albums produced by Gerry Bron
Bronze Records albums
Warner Records albums